The Wyoming Stock Growers Association (WSGA) is an American cattle organization started in 1872 among Wyoming cattle ranchers to standardize and organize the cattle industry but quickly grew into a political force that has been called "the de facto territorial government" of Wyoming's organization into early statehood, and wielded great influence throughout the Western United States.

The WSGA is still active to this day. It is best known for its rich history and is perhaps most famous for its role in Wyoming's Johnson County War.

Formation
Early into Wyoming's Territorial formation in 1868 cattle men began to lobby the powerful territorial government, and befriended John A. Campbell, the first territorial governor of Wyoming who served from 1869 to 1875.

During May 1871, Campbell sponsored the first organization of cattlemen in the territory and became the president of this Wyoming Stock Grazier's Association. When the second legislature assembled at Cheyenne in November 1871, the Governor called a simultaneous meeting of the stock growers, and a joint session was held in the hall of the house of representatives.

The Governor's cattle organization soon disbanded, but on November 29, 1873, a new group called the Laramie County Stock Association was formed by some former members and became the nucleus of the Wyoming Stock Growers' Association.

History
The WSGA historically organized roundups, scheduled cattle shipments, and tracked cattle brands, but was  also active, especially before 1900, in eliminating cattle rustling.  The WSGA hired a number of professional detectives whose job it was to prevent and punish cattle thieves.

In the late 19th century, while Wyoming was transitioning from a territory into statehood, the WSGA was one of the few large scale organizations that wielded any type of authority in the region.  WSGA members also formed the core of the famous Cheyenne Club, located at 17th Street and Warren Avenue in Wyoming's capital city.  It was founded primarily by young men from prominent east coast, British, and European families and became one of the wealthiest and most exclusive establishments on the frontier.  The membership not only lavishly entertained socialites, celebrities, and foreign dignitaries at the club, but also was highly instrumental in molding the state's early political, economic, and social infrastructures.

The WSGA held a quasi-governmental status during those years and was very influential in shaping Wyoming's state government and statutes. In that respect, there were four members of the WSGA in the U.S. Congress, as well as several governors and the majority of state legislators that were members in the association. Many of the WSGA's rules and regulations became state laws. 

In 1943 when Franklin D. Roosevelt established Jackson Hole National Monument, the association was the first to oppose what they called the "Jackson Hole Seizure" and the establishment of Grand Teton National Park. They advocated for the cattlemen of Teton County to retain their grazing rights and fought hard to change the legislature. While often accused of secrecy and heavy-handedness, the WSGA nonetheless kept extremely detailed records, paperwork, minutes of meetings, and preserved nearly all correspondence to and from the association. The number of letters preserved between the 1870s and the 1930s alone is estimated to be in excess of 50,000, while dozens of boxes exist containing paperwork and other records. The overwhelming majority of records are said to pertain solely to cattle industry organization tasks (such as brand registration, the tracking of cattle shipments, etc.) and underscore the day-to-day importance of the industry association in addition to the political role it also played. The records are currently held at the American Heritage Center at the University of Wyoming.

Johnson County War
Prior to the Johnson County War, Joe Horner (better known as Frank Canton) left his Johnson County sheriff position to become WSGA's chief of detectives. He later led an army of Texas killers hired by the WSGA that killed two Johnson County settlers in what has become known as the Johnson County War. He was charged for this act but was released.

Today
According to the WSGA, the three main roles of today's association are:
 Advocating on issues affecting the cattle industry, Wyoming agriculture and rural community living
 Providing members with timely information regarding events in the cattle industry and the activities of the association
 Promoting the role of the Wyoming cattle industry in resource stewardship, animal care and the production of high-quality safe and nutritious beef

The association currently has a full-time staff of three, along with eight executive officers. To become a voting member of the WSGA, one must raise either cattle, horses, mules, or sheep.

Notable members

M. V. Boughton, first president and 7th Mayor of Cheyenne, Wyoming
Robert Mills Grant, former state representative from Platte County active in the formulation of "branding" law in Wyoming
Clifford Hansen, president of the association from 1953 to 1955; later Wyoming governor and U.S. senator
Ray Hunkins, Wheatland lawyer and rancher and the Republican gubernatorial nominee in 2006
Mary Mead, Jackson rancher and the 1990 Republican gubernatorial nominee

Notes

Other references

External links
 The Wyoming Stock Growers Association
Wyoming Stock Growers Association records at the University of Wyoming - American Heritage Center
Select digital records of the Wyoming Stock Growers Association at the AHC digital Archives
The Infamous Johnson County - The Papers of Fred G.S. Hesse at the AHC blog

 
History of Wyoming
Trade associations based in the United States
Defunct organizations based in Wyoming
Organizations based in Cheyenne, Wyoming